Shitara (written: 設楽) is a Japanese surname. Notable people with the surname include:

, Japanese comedian and television presenter

See also
Shitara, Aichi, town located in Kitashitara District, Aichi Prefecture, Japan.

Japanese-language surnames